Saisy is a commune in the Saône-et-Loire department in the region of Bourgogne-Franche-Comté in eastern France.

Geography

An aerial view of Saisy (le Bourg) from geoportail.fr.

The Chalon-Autun-Beaune triangle is known for its scenery, cuisine and wines. It is gradually becoming a popular place for second home owners from Paris, Holland and increasingly the UK and the US.

There are views across the countryside from every part of the commune, yet busy towns and cities, not least Dijon and Lyon, are on the doorstep.

The commune of Saisy is composed of five hamlets, le Bourg where the town hall, the church and the school are situated, Sivry, le Vesvre de Saisy, la Forêt de Saisy and Changey.

History
There are two important monuments at Saisy le Bourg; the twelfth century Church and the Statue of the Madonna.
In the year 2000 two signs were added to the RD 973 indicating "Église Romane du XII eme". The choir stalls, the bell tower and the apse are 12th century. The apse is built entirely out of local stone and vaults support the roof in roofing stones.
The statue of the Madonna commands a view across the valley and was erected to commemorate the 50th anniversary of a miracle at Lourdes on 8 September 1884. Local school children traditionally visited the monument on The Feast of the Assumption of the Blessed Virgin Mary on 15 August but the last procession was in the 1960s. Latterly the statue also became a war memorial.

Demographics

Highlights
The twelfth century church opposite the town hall is classified by the l'Architecte de Batiments de France. This affords protection to the houses in le Bourg, with planning permission requiring their approval as well as the local maire.

Horse-riding is available nearby and there are public swimming pools within a short distance. In the summer months camp sites at Épinac, Arnay le Duc and Nolay offer swimming in the lakes.

There are many chateaux locally which are well worth a visit, especially the Chateau De La Rochepot which is perched on the hillside just off the D973 to Beaune.

The Hospices de Beaune is one of the most famous places in Burgundy and its roof is the signature of the Dukes of Burgundy.

There are a multitude of excursions, hikes and walks, in almost the whole of the commune. The Morvan National Park, the equivalent of a rich man's Lake District in the UK, was the base for the French Resistance in the Second World War and is a short drive away. You can also use the area as a base for skiing holidays to the Jura (1 hour away) or Chamonix (2 hours away).

Excellent vineyards of the Côte-d'Or and the Côte Chalonnaise are just nearby. There are 68 million bottles of wine produced from the appellation contrôlée areas of the Côte-d'Or département. Wine tasting is a popular pastime with degustation available at numerous caves in the area. If you're an oenophile you won't be disappointed. Wine tasting is a highlight of the area and the history of wine in this region is a rich one. The vineyards, many of which are near the D973, read like a who's who of both red and white wine: Pommard, Volnay, Gevrey-Chambertin, Nuits-Saint-Georges, Clos de Vougeot, Pernand-Vergelesses, Ladoix-Serrigny, Aloxe-Corton, Savigny-lès-Beaune, Chorey-lès-Beaune, Beaune, Corton-Charlemagne, Saint Romain, Monthélie, Auxey-Duresses, Meursault, Montrachet, Saint-Aubin, Puligny-Montrachet, Chassagne-Montrachet, Santenay, Bouzeron, Rully, Mercurey, Givry, Buxy, and Montagny.

Transportation
The French motorway system is second to none and Switzerland, Germany and even Italy are all within a few hours drive.

There are cheap flights from the UK to Lyon or Geneva which are only 2 hours drive from the commune.

The TGV rail link passes close by and a 20-minute drive to Gare du Creusot TGV means you can park your car (free) at the station and take a day trip (or longer) to Paris or even London.

Neighboring places
The market towns of Épinac, Nolay and la Rochepot are within 3 miles each side of the commune where there are supermarkets, garages and restaurants.

Highlights of the area north of Saisy include Beaune (of course), Clos de Vougeot, the 15th century Hôtel-Dieu, Beaune, medieval Chateau de la Rochepot is only away.

To the southwest, 20 minutes along the D973 from the commune of Saisy and the gateway to the Morvan National Park is the city of Autun. Even before it was conquered by Julius Cæsar, Autun was a bustling city. Through the centuries it has been renowned for its Roman ruins, the 12th Century Cathedral, its Romanesque sculptures, its Rolin Museum and its history.

See also
Communes of the Saône-et-Loire department

References

Gallery

External links

 Burgundy Today
 The Morvan National Park

Communes of Saône-et-Loire